Bronck Farm 13-Sided Barn is a historic barn located at Coxsackie in Greene County, New York.  It was built about 1832 and is a 13 sided frame structure with a hipped roof surmounted by an octagonal cupola.  It has an overall diameter of 70 feet and the one story interior is open in plan.  It is related to, but listed separately from the Bronck House.

It meets the definition of a round barn, as a polygon shape approaching circular.

It was listed on the National Register of Historic Places in 1984.

References

Round barns in New York (state)
Barns on the National Register of Historic Places in New York (state)
Infrastructure completed in 1832
Buildings and structures in Greene County, New York
National Register of Historic Places in Greene County, New York